The Jellys were a three piece English punk/pop band, featuring ex-members of The Wildhearts.

Biography
The Jellys were formed by CJ (ex-The Wildhearts/Honeycrack) and featured ex-Wildhearts drummer Stidi and Jeff Hateley (ex-Wolfsbane) on bass guitar.  CJ wrote a large amount of material which were designed for a "three piece sort of punk pop band", so formed the Jellys when it was clear that Honeycrack were going their separate ways.

In 1999 the band took on another guitarist in the shape of Davie from Twister, beefing up the sound and the already strong live harmony vocals.

The band toured the UK extensively as well as playing in Japan where they had a strong following. They released two albums (Welcome To Our World and Doctored for Supersound), and one live album Big Big Trip on a Pantomime Hoarse, but later disbanded when The Wildhearts reformed in 2001.

Their song "Lemonade Girl" was referenced in UK feature film Life Just Is.

Line-up
CJ
Jeff Hateley
Stidi
Davie Jardine
Bryce Yoder
Luke DePalatis

Discography
Welcome To Our World (Mir 1998)
Doctored for Supersound (Mir 2000)
Big Big Trip on a Pantomime Hoarse (live) (Mir 1999)

References

External links
Interview with CJ

English punk rock groups